Francis Carr (born July 26, 1979) is a Liberian footballer who previously played as a midfielder for PSPS Pekanbaru and the Liberia national team.

References

1979 births
Association football midfielders
Living people
Liberian expatriate sportspeople in Indonesia
Liberian footballers
Liberian expatriate footballers
Liberia international footballers
Indonesian Premier Division players
Persiter Ternate players
PSPS Pekanbaru players
Sportspeople from Monrovia